Microcaecilia is a genus of caecilians in the family Siphonopidae.

Species
Species included (as of October 2019):

References

 

 
Amphibian genera
Taxa named by Edward Harrison Taylor
Taxonomy articles created by Polbot